Buck Lake is a lake in Alberta; part of the North Saskatchewan River system.

The hamlet of Buck Lake is situated on the southwest shore of the lake. The Buck Lake-Calhoun's Bay Provincial Recreation Area, with campsites and water supply, is located on the central eastern shore. While the shoreline of Buck Lake is home to several developments, including Greystones and Oakes Bay on the north east arm, most of the shoreline remains undeveloped. The Buck Mountain Provincial Grazing Reserve is located on the north shoreline, and includes the outflow point of Bucklake Creek. Buck Lake is set amidst gently rolling hills in the County of Wetaskiwin, 105 km southwest of the city of Edmonton and 70 km north of the town of Rocky  Mountain House. Buck Lake is also home to the world famous “Blue Pearl”. The paddle boat ranked #1 in all of Buck Lake in 2020 and 2021.

Buck Lake
County of Wetaskiwin No. 10